Mille Lacs Lake (also called Lake Mille Lacs or Mille Lacs) is a large but shallow lake in the U.S. state of Minnesota. It is located in the counties of Mille Lacs, Aitkin, and Crow Wing, roughly 75 miles north of the Minneapolis-St. Paul metropolitan area.

Mille Lacs means "thousand lakes" in French. In the Ojibwe language of the people who historically occupied this area, the lake is called Misi-zaaga'igan ("grand lake").

Physical features
Much of the main lake has depths ranging from 20- to 38-feet. Gravel and rock bars are common in the southern half of the lake.

Islands
Mille Lacs Lake hosts numerous islands, many of which are an acre or smaller and are in private ownership.

The following list is in order from largest to smallest.
 Malone Island (35 acres)
 Mulybys Island (5.35 acres)
 Upper Twin Island (3.75 acres)
 Rainbow Island (3.25 acres)
 West Lower Twin Island (2.56 acres)
 Half Moon Island (1.37 acres)
 Pete Island (0.6 acres)
 Doe Island (0.55 acres)
 Spider Island (0.5 acres)
 East Lower Twin Island (0.4 acres)
 Spirit Island (0.31 acres)
 Pine Island (0.23 acres)
 Hennepin Island (0.17 acres)

Fishing
Shallow reef-top fishing exists on all sides of the lake.  Deep-water angling takes place on the southern deep gravel and rocks as well as on dozens of mud flats in the north half of the lake.  Shoreline break fishing on varied bottom types occurs all around the lake.  The weed line is at nine to twelve feet. There are many local fisherman's names for some features of the lake. Spirit Island, the small rock-made island in the south west region of the lake, consists of weathered and eroded pink and white granite boulders. Spirit Island is one of two Islands in Mille Lakes Lake designated as a National Wildlife Refuge.

The lake has many species of fish including walleye, northern pike, muskie, jumbo perch, smallmouth bass, largemouth bass, black crappie, burbot, and tullibee.  It is one of Minnesota's most popular fishing lakes. Ice fishing houses number in the thousands during the winter. It is a prime spawning grounds for walleye.  Billions of walleye eggs and fry are produced there every year.  In the absence of a thermocline, fish can travel the whole area of the lake.

History
Archaeologists indicate that the area around the lake is one of the earliest known sites of human settlement in the state of Minnesota. The Rum River drains from Lake Mille Lacs into the Mississippi River to the south at present-day Anoka.

On early French maps, the lake was also identified as Lac Buade or Minsisaugaigun. On a 1733 map by Henry Popple, Mille Lacs Lake is shown as "Lake Miſsiſsucaigan or Baude". As late as 1843, it was referred to as "Mini Sagaigonin or Mille Lacs" on United States government maps.

The Mdewakanton group of the Santee Sioux identified by their location around the lake. Likewise, the French named the lake as "Mille Lacs Lake", as the Brainerd Lakes Area was called "Region of Thousand Lakes".

Areas around the lake are protected and available to the public in state parks: Father Hennepin State Park and Mille Lacs Kathio State Park. Portions of the Mille Lacs Indian Reservation, of the federally recognized Mille Lacs Ojibwe, border the lake.

In 2013, a windblown wall of ice, called an ice shove, moved off the lake and damaged houses on the lake shore.

Towns on Mille Lacs Lake
Garrison, Minnesota
Isle, Minnesota
Malmo Township, Minnesota
Onamia, Minnesota
Vineland, Minnesota
Wahkon, Minnesota
Wealthwood Township, Minnesota

See also
List of lakes in Minnesota

Notes

External links

Mille Lacs Lake page from the Minnesota DNR
Mille Lacs Area Tourism Council
Mille Lacs Messenger newspaper
Mille Lacs Webcam
Mille Lacs - Isle Bay Webcam - Hunter Winfields
Mille Lacs - Isle Bay Webcam - Chapman's Mille Lacs Resort & Guide Service

Lakes of Aitkin County, Minnesota
Lakes of Crow Wing County, Minnesota
Mille Lacs
Lakes of Mille Lacs County, Minnesota
Mdewakanton
Religious places of the indigenous peoples of North America